J.M. Harvey Co., LLC, under the trade name Harveys Supermarkets, is an American supermarket chain with stores in Georgia and Florida. The company is a subsidiary of Southeastern Grocers, which is headquartered in Jacksonville, Florida.

History
The chain was founded by J. M. and Iris Harvey in Nashville, Georgia in 1924. Their son, Joe, took over the chain in 1950. Harveys had grown from a total of 22 stores in 1981 to 43 stores in 2003. Harveys growth during the 1990s was primarily through acquisitions.

Acquisition By Delhaize
In 2003, Delhaize Group acquired the then 43-store strong Harveys chain for $26.1 million. After the acquisition, Harveys and sister chain Food Lion engaged in a number of synergies: over a dozen Food Lion stores were converted to Harveys; Procurement, supply chain, and back office functions were handled by Food Lion; and while Harveys management was still headquartered in Nashville, Georgia, they answered to Food Lion management in Salisbury, North Carolina.

In May 2006, Harveys announced they would close their warehouse and distribution center in Nashville, Georgia to trim costs and enhance the resources of Food Lion, affecting about 200 employees in the process. Food Lion would support Harveys stores through their own distribution centers in South Carolina and Florida.

Acquisition By BI-LO Holdings, LLC/Southeastern Grocers
In May 2013, Harveys was sold along with sister supermarket chains Sweetbay and Reid's to BI-LO Holdings, LLC for $265 million. In September 2013, Southeastern Grocers was created by Lone Star Funds as the new parent company for BI-LO, Harveys, and Winn-Dixie. The new parent company then filed to raise as much as $500 million in a U.S. initial public offering. On August 19, 2014, Southeastern Grocers withdrew their IPO filing with the SEC, aborting the process of listing the stock for public sale.

2018 Bankruptcy
On March 15, 2018, Southeastern Grocers announced they would file a plan of reorganization under Chapter 11 by the end of March. According to the company, the restructuring would decrease overall debt levels by over $500 million. Under this plan, 94 stores across the BI-LO, Fresco y Más, Harveys, and Winn-Dixie brands would close.

On March 28, 2018, Southeastern agreed to sell three BI-LO locations in South Carolina along with three Harveys locations in Georgia to three independent Piggly Wiggly store owners. The deals are in conjunction with the restructuring support agreement revealed by Southeastern Grocers.

In May 2018, Southeastern Grocers restructuring plan was confirmed by a U.S. Bankruptcy judge in Delaware. At the end of that month, Southeastern Grocers announced that it had completed its financial restructuring and was emerging from bankruptcy. As part of the restructuring, $522 million in debt was exchanged for equity in Southeastern Grocers, though it was not announced who was receiving the equity shares. Southeastern Grocers exited bankruptcy with 575 stores in seven states, down from 704 locations. They also announced a planned remodels of 100 stores in 2018.

Harveys Today
The Harveys brand continued to adjust under the Southeastern Grocers watch. In June 2014, soon after the acquisition of the former Delhaize stores was complete, three Winn-Dixie stores in the Albany, Georgia area were converted to the Harveys banner. At the same time, seven Harveys store in Georgia were converted over to the Winn-Dixie banner. These stores converted included three in Brunswick, two in Valdosta and one in Saint Marys.

In May 2016, Southeastern unveiled its new Harveys Supermarket store concept at a former Winn-Dixie location in Jacksonville, Florida. Two months later, Southeastern Grocers rebranded an existing BI-LO location in Charlotte, North Carolina to the Harveys banner. This became the first North Carolina location for the Harveys brand.

In November 2016, Southeastern Grocers continued the Harveys expansion by converting 16 Winn-Dixie and BI-LO stores to the Harveys Supermarket banner. These included two BI-LO locations in Augusta, Georgia, two additional Charlotte, North Carolina BI-LO locations, three BI-LO locations in Columbia, South Carolina, and a BI-LO location in Greenwood, South Carolina. An additional seven Winn-Dixie Florida locations were converted with six of them in Jacksonville. 55 other Harveys locations, mainly in Georgia, were upgraded at the same time.

In May 2017, Southeastern Grocers announced the closing of a Harveys store in Albany, Georgia as part of a corporate-wide closure of 23 locations along with the elimination of some department lead roles at stores. In July 2017, it was announced that Southeastern Grocers would debut the Harveys brand in the Central and West Florida markets with the conversion of 7 Winn-Dixie stores with the conversions taking place in early August. In October 2017, Southeastern announced that three more West Florida Winn-Dixie stores would be converted to the Harveys brand in November 2017, growing their store count to 80.

In February 2019, Southeastern announced plans to shutter 22 locations. This round of closures included 2 Harveys Supermarkets in Florida and South Carolina.

Locations
As of February 2022, there are 67 Harveys Supermarkets located in Georgia, Florida.

References

External links

Economy of the Southeastern United States
Supermarkets of the United States
Companies based in Jacksonville, Florida
Retail companies established in 1924
1924 establishments in Georgia (U.S. state)
2013 mergers and acquisitions
Companies that filed for Chapter 11 bankruptcy in 2018